The men's 800 metre freestyle was the 17th event of the swimming program at the 2007 World Aquatics Championships held in Rod Laver Arena in Melbourne, Australia. The event was swum on the morning of 27 March (heats) and in the evening of 28 March. 46 swimmers were entered in the event, of which 43 swam in one of 6 preliminary heats. The top-8 finishers from the prelims qualified ("Q") to swim in the final the next evening.

The existing records at the start of the event were:
World record (WR): 7:38.65, Grant Hackett (Australia), 27 July 2005 in Montreal, Canada.
Championship record (CR): same

On 11 September 2007, the Court of Arbitration for Sport stripped Oussama Mellouli of Tunisia of his gold medal and nullified his result as part of a retroactive 18-month suspension for an earlier doping violation.

Results

Final

Heats

See also
Swimming at the 2005 World Aquatics Championships – Men's 800 metre freestyle
Swimming at the 2009 World Aquatics Championships – Men's 800 metre freestyle

References

World Aquatics Championships
Swimming at the 2007 World Aquatics Championships